In a 1969 paper, Dutch mathematician Nicolaas Govert de Bruijn proved several results about packing congruent rectangular bricks (of any dimension) into larger rectangular boxes, in such a way that no space is left over. One of these results is now known as de Bruijn's theorem. According to this theorem, a "harmonic brick" (one in which each side length is a multiple of the next smaller side length) can only be packed into a box whose dimensions are multiples of the brick's dimensions.

Example
De Bruijn was led to prove this result after his then-seven-year-old son, F. W. de Bruijn, was unable to pack bricks of dimension  into a  cube. The cube has a volume equal to that of  bricks, but only  bricks may be packed into it. One way to see this is to partition the cube into  smaller cubes of size  colored alternately black and white. This coloring has more unit cells of one color than of the other, but with this coloring any placement of the  brick must have equal numbers of cells of each color. Therefore, any tiling by bricks would also have equal numbers of cells of each color, an impossibility. De Bruijn's theorem proves that a perfect packing with these dimensions is impossible, in a more general way that applies to many other dimensions of bricks and boxes.

Boxes that are multiples of the brick
Suppose that a -dimensional rectangular box (mathematically a cuboid) has integer side lengths  and a brick has lengths . The box can then be filled with such bricks in a trivial way with all the bricks oriented the same way.

A generalization
Not every packing involves boxes that are multiples of bricks. For instance, as de Bruijn observes, a  rectangular box can be filled with copies of a  rectangular brick, although not with all the bricks oriented the same way.

Harmonic bricks
The second of de Bruijn's results, the one called de Bruijn's theorem, concerns the case where each side of the brick is an integer multiple of the next smaller side. De Bruijn calls a brick with this property harmonic. For instance, the most frequently used bricks in the USA have dimensions  (in inches), which is not harmonic, but a type of brick sold as "Roman brick" has the harmonic dimensions .

De Bruijn's theorem states that, if a harmonic brick is packed into a box, then the box must be a multiple of the brick. For instance, the three-dimensional harmonic brick with side lengths 1, 2, and 6 can only be packed into boxes in which one of the three sides is a multiple of six and one of the remaining two sides is even. Packings of a harmonic brick into a box may involve copies of the brick that are rotated with respect to each other. Nevertheless, the theorem states that the only boxes that can be packed in this way are boxes that could also be packed by translates of the brick.

 provided an alternative proof of the three-dimensional case of de Bruijn's theorem, based on the algebra of polynomials.

Non-harmonic bricks
The third of de Bruijn's results is that, if a brick is not harmonic, then there is a box that it can fill that is not a multiple of the brick. The packing of the  brick into the  box provides an example of this phenomenon.

In the two-dimensional case, the third of de Bruijn's results is easy to visualize. This larger box is a multiple of the brick if and only if the brick is harmonic.

References

External links

Theorems in discrete geometry